Breaking Atoms is the debut album of American/Canadian hip hop group Main Source, released July 23, 1991, on Wild Pitch Records. Production was handled by the group, primarily by member Large Professor, and took place during 1989 to 1991 at Homeboy Studio, Power Play Studios, and Libra Digital in New York City. Recorded during the golden age of hip hop, Breaking Atoms is distinguished stylistically by its incorporation of jazz and soul music samples. The album has been highly regarded by music writers due mostly to its production, whose heavy and original use of sampling influenced hip hop producers for a considerable portion of the 1990s.

The album has been widely regarded by writers and music critics as a significantly influential album and has been noted for debuting rapper Nas, who appears on the track "Live at the Barbeque". His contribution to the song was sampled on "The Genesis", the intro track to his debut album Illmatic (1994). Breaking Atoms has been recognized as one of the most important records in hip hop history, and was out of print in the United States after the demise of Wild Pitch Records in 1997. It was reissued on April 22, 2008 through Fontana Distribution.

Music
Breaking Atoms was produced using the E-mu SP-1200. Allmusic's Steve Huey writes that the album's acclaim lies mostly in its production, which popularized a number of now widely imitated techniques. Huey describes that the "intricately constructed tracks are filled with jazz and soul samples, layered percussion, off-kilter sampling effects, and an overall sonic richness." RapReviews also notes that the beats are the cornerstone of the record. Dan Nishimoto of PopMatters considers the album's sampling to be "neatly layered, its subject matter is modest, and its overall tone is simply well executed fun." In his book Classic Material: The Hip-Hop Album Guide, Oliver Wang writes that Large Professor as a producer "thinks in complete song structure, never focusing on one single element—a loop, a break—but always juggling them in unison."

Reception

Upon its release, Breaking Atoms received critical acclaim. J the Sultan of The Source hailed it as "New York hip-hop at its best", praising its "slamming beats and smooth, nod-your-head-to-this grooves thick with jazz-infused samples", as well as the "clever rhymes that you want to follow word-for-word." Entertainment Weeklys James Bernard wrote that "Main Source may not break much new ground, but [it] offer[s] a clever, quietly seductive collection in which the bass and drum tracks casually strut instead of stomp, and the sparse samples of guitar and horns allow the Large Professor's voice to take center stage."

Since its initial reception, the album has received retrospective acclaim from writers and music critics. AllMusic writer Steve Huey declared it "one of the quintessential cult classics in hip-hop history". In 2004's The New Rolling Stone Album Guide, Peter Relic wrote that "From the candy-colored cover depicting the three members crowded around a fantasy science project to the uptempo beats and matching fast raps, it's a period piece whose meticulous presentation... make it an enduring pleasure from a bygone era." PopMatters Dan Nishimoto called it "deliberately smart and rough" and praised the varied scope of its production and sampling. RapReviews notes that many acknowledge Breaking Atoms to be on a similar level to Nas' Illmatic (1994) and A Tribe Called Quest's first three albums.

Accolades 
SoundProof magazine lists the album at number sixteen in "The Top 20 Toronto Albums Ever" and About.com's Henry Adaso lists it at number twenty in the "100 Greatest Hip-Hop Albums". In 1998, The Source selected the album as one of its 100 Best Rap Albums. Initially giving a four-and-a-half out of five "mic" rating, The Source gave the album a five "mic" rating in a retrospective list of "5 Mic Hip-Hop Classics" in its 150th issue.

The album was named as one of two jury vote winners, alongside Buffy Sainte-Marie's It's My Way!, of the Polaris Heritage Prize at the 2020 Polaris Music Prize.

Track listing 
All tracks produced by Main Source, except #8 co-produced by Pete Rock.

Personnel
Credits for Breaking Atoms adapted from AllMusic.

Akinyele – rap
Peter Bodtke – photography
Terry Clarke – design, cover art concept
Amy Fine – art direction
Chris Gehringer – mastering
K-Cut – turntables
Large Professor – vocals

Main Source – producer, mixing
Tony Papa Michael – engineer
Nas – rap
Anton Pukshansky – bass, engineer, mixing
Pete Rock – associate producer
Sir Scratch – turntables

Singles

Chart history

Album

Singles

References

External links
 Breaking Atoms at Discogs
 Album Review at Oh Word

1991 debut albums
Main Source albums
Wild Pitch Records albums
Albums produced by Pete Rock
Albums produced by Large Professor
Albums produced by K-Cut (producer)